William Fellowes may refer to:
 William Fellowes (MP, died 1804) (c. 1726–1804), British member of parliament, MP for Ludlow, and for Andover
 William Henry Fellowes (1769–1837), his son, British member of parliament, MP for Huntingdon, and for Huntingdonshire
 William Fellowes, 2nd Baron de Ramsey (1848–1925), British member of parliament, MP for Huntingdonshire, and for Ramsey 
 Billy Fellowes (1910–1987), English footballer